Dean Michael Cox (born 1 August 1981) is a former Australian rules footballer and current assistant coach of the Sydney Swans who played for the West Coast Eagles in the Australian Football League (AFL). After winning the Simpson Medal as the best player in the grand final in his first season, Cox was recruited to West Coast with the 28th pick in the 2000 Rookie Draft. He made his senior debut during the 2001 season, and played in West Coast's 2006 premiership side. A ruckman, Cox was named in the All-Australian team six times, including four seasons consecutively from 2005 to 2008, and was considered the outstanding player in his position throughout much of his career. He won West Coast's best and fairest award in 2008, and finished in the top three on four other occasions. Cox retired at the end of the 2014 season, finishing his career with 290 games, a club record, and 169 goals.

Early career
Cox was a naturally gifted sportsman who excelled at sports whilst growing up in Dampier, Western Australia. Played for Dampier Sharks.

His uncle George Michalczyk, a former Australian rules player himself, recommended Cox to the club he began his senior career with, East Perth.

Cox played colts for East Perth in 1999 and at the end of the season was invited to train with the West Coast Eagles in their pre-season. He impressed enough for him to be rookie-listed, however he struggled in pre-season training and was criticised for being slightly uncoordinated.

Meanwhile, he played senior football for East Perth. He began the season fifth in the order of an impressive list of ruckmen, but by season's end he had impressed so much he earned a place as the first ruckman in their grand final team and collected a Simpson Medal for his efforts.

The Eagles then put him on their senior list and he made his AFL debut in 2001. Initially he showed few signs of his potential at that level. However, he was persisted with.

2005 season
He came of age during the 2005 season, where he became a dominant player for the Eagles and is now considered one of their best.

He topped the year off with a terrific finals series, living up to his high standards. Two incidents stand out in particular for Cox – one where in the Qualifying Final against Sydney he took two saving marks in defence to secure the game in the dying moments, where his team got home by less than a goal. The other moment that stands out had the Eagles on the other end, where in the Grand Final three weeks later, also against Sydney, he took a strong mark on the half-forward line and speared the ball in towards a pack in the dying moments. Unfortunately for the Eagles, Leo Barry took a saving mark and secured the Swans a victory by less than a goal.

2006 season

Cox got off to a superb start to the season and was one of the premier players in the competition early. He continued his good form and established himself as one of the league's premier ruckmen, averaging over 20 hitouts and almost 20 disposals per game through Round 8 of the 2006 Season. However, in Round 13 he collided with a hard bump from Bulldog Adam Cooney, which left him with a broken collar bone. Cox returned to the side, and was a key figure in the Eagles thrilling 1 point win of Sydney in the 2006 AFL Grand Final, where he dominated against Sydney ruckman Stephen Doyle and Darren Jolly. Cox played 21 games in 2006, taking 141 marks and kicking 14 goals.

2007–2014

Cox played 21 games in 2007 and all 22 in 2008 as the club missed the finals, in what was a turbulent few years. The departure of Ben Cousins and Chris Judd (Carlton) and questions surrounding the clubs culture meant that Cox had to step up. Many thought he would be appointed Captain for 2008, but the position was awarded to Darren Glass. Cox made the All-Australian Team in both of these years, continuing to be the dominant ruckman of the competition despite playing in a struggling side (mostly in 2008). He also did no harm to his reputation as a ruckman/midfielder, collecting 25 disposals or more 5 times in 2007, and 7 times in 2008, and regularly featuring among the best. Standout games included the Semi-Final against Collingwood in 2007 that went to extra time (which West Coast lost), where Cox collected 27 disposals, 9 marks, 29 hitouts and a goal. In Round 10 of 2008 against Collingwood, again an Eagles loss, Cox gathered 30 disposals, 7 marks, 36 hitouts and kicked two goals.

Cox finished his career with 6,628 hitouts, an AFL record at the time of his retirement.

Playing style
Dean Cox was a very versatile ruckman, who tends to cover much ground. Sometimes considered to be the Eagles 'fifth midfielder', Cox is a modern example of a mobile ruckman. He effectively wins knock-outs and can assist the likes of midfielders Daniel Kerr,  Matthew Priddis and Matt Rosa. Cox was widely considered as the premier ruckman of the competition, as seen by his selection in six All-Australian teams.

Statistics

|- style="background-color: #EAEAEA"
! scope="row" style="text-align:center" | 2001
|
| 20 || 17 || 2 || 2 || 62 || 69 || 131 || 38 || 18 || 184 || 0.1 || 0.1 || 3.6 || 4.1 || 7.7 || 2.2 || 1.1 || 10.8
|-
! scope="row" style="text-align:center" | 2002
|
| 20 || 19 || 7 || 1 || 96 || 97 || 193 || 82 || 17 || 307 || 0.4 || 0.1 || 5.1 || 5.1 || 10.2 || 4.3 || 0.9 || 16.2
|- style="background-color: #EAEAEA"
! scope="row" style="text-align:center" | 2003
|
| 20 || 19 || 10 || 3 || 125 || 88 || 213 || 74 || 12 || 332 || 0.5 || 0.2 || 6.6 || 4.6 || 11.2 || 3.9 || 0.6 || 17.5
|-
! scope="row" style="text-align:center" | 2004
|
| 20 || 23 || 5 || 10 || 172 || 142 || 314 || 117 || 37 || 512 || 0.2 || 0.4 || 7.5 || 6.2 || 13.7 || 5.1 || 1.6 || 22.3
|- style="background-color: #EAEAEA"
! scope="row" style="text-align:center" | 2005
|
| 20 || 25 || 22 || 3 || 257 || 152 || 409 || 163 || 29 || 595 || 0.9 || 0.1 || 10.3 || 6.1 || 16.4 || 6.5 || 1.2 || 23.8
|-
! scope="row" style="text-align:center" | 2006
|
| 20 || 21 || 14 || 9 || 233 || 146 || 379 || 141 || 27 || 449 || 0.7 || 0.4 || 11.1 || 7.0 || 18.0 || 6.7 || 1.3 || 21.4
|- style="background-color: #EAEAEA"
! scope="row" style="text-align:center" | 2007
|
| 20 || 21 || 13 || 9 || 234 || 163 || 397 || 155 || 23 || 449 || 0.6 || 0.4 || 11.1 || 7.8 || 18.9 || 7.4 || 1.1 || 21.4
|-
! scope="row" style="text-align:center" | 2008
|
| 20 || 22 || 9 || 10 || 233 || 253 || 486 || 126 || 34 || 571 || 0.4 || 0.5 || 10.6 || 11.5 || 22.1 || 5.7 || 1.5 || 26.0
|- style="background-color: #EAEAEA"
! scope="row" style="text-align:center" | 2009
|
| 20 || 13 || 8 || 7 || 139 || 145 || 284 || 75 || 23 || 346 || 0.6 || 0.5 || 11.2 || 10.7 || 21.8 || 5.8 || 1.8 || 26.6
|-
! scope="row" style="text-align:center" | 2010
|
| 20 || 22 || 10 || 9 || 178 || 194 || 372 || 91 || 37 || 502 || 0.5 || 0.4 || 8.1 || 8.8 || 16.9 || 4.1 || 1.7 || 22.8
|- style="background-color: #EAEAEA"
! scope="row" style="text-align:center" | 2011
|
| 20 || 25 || 20 || 17 || 270 || 176 || 446 || 137 || 43 || 716 || 0.8 || 0.7|| 10.8 || 7.0 || 17.8  || 5.5 || 1.7 || 28.6
|-
! scope="row" style="text-align:center" | 2012
|
| 20 || 24 || 28 || 14 || 238 || 147 || 385 || 144 || 39 || 628 || 1.2 || 0.6 || 9.9 || 6.1 || 16.0 || 6.0 || 1.6 || 26.2
|- style="background-color: #EAEAEA"
! scope="row" style="text-align:center" | 2013
|
| 20 || 22 || 13 || 18 || 209 || 140 || 349 || 118 || 52 || 597 || 0.6 || 0.8 || 9.5 || 6.4 || 15.9 || 5.4 || 2.4 || 27.1
|-
! scope="row" style="text-align:center" | 2014
|
| 20 || 17 || 8 || 6 || 142 || 103 || 245 || 80 || 39 || 405 || 0.5 || 0.4 || 8.4 || 6.1 || 14.4 || 4.7 || 2.3 || 23.8
|- class="sortbottom"
! colspan=3| Career
! 290
! 169
! 118
! 2588
! 2015
! 4603
! 1541
! 430
! 6628
! 0.6
! 0.4
! 8.9
! 7.0
! 15.9
! 5.3
! 1.5
! 22.9
|}

Personal life
Cox married Kerry Lavell at a ceremony at Leeuwin Estate in Margaret River in December 2011, having dated her for three years previously. Outside of football, Cox co-owns a seafood restaurant, Beluga, in Claremont, with Andrew Embley, which opened in April 2011.

In December 2012, Cox and his wife Kerry welcomed their first child, a girl Charlotte Ivy.

References

External links

1981 births
All-Australians (AFL)
Australian rules footballers from Western Australia
East Perth Football Club players
Living people
People from Dampier, Western Australia
John Worsfold Medal winners
West Coast Eagles players
West Coast Eagles Premiership players
Australian people of Polish descent
West Australian Football Hall of Fame inductees
Australian Football Hall of Fame inductees
One-time VFL/AFL Premiership players